Samantha Janus represented United Kingdom in the Eurovision Song Contest 1991 with the Paul Curtis-written song "A Message to Your Heart", which was placed 10th.

Before Eurovision

A Song for Europe 1991 
That year's A Song for Europe was held on 29 March 1991 and was hosted by Terry Wogan. Following the somewhat negative comments by one member of the celebrity panel in 1990, the panel idea was dropped in 1991. The BBC Concert Orchestra under the direction of Ronnie Hazlehurst as conductor accompanied all the songs, the musicians appearing on camera for the first time since 1978.

The eight songs in contention to represent the UK were presented during Terry Wogan's Wogan chat show on BBC1. Two songs were presented during each of four broadcasts between 20 and 27 March.

A separate results show was broadcast on BBC1 the same evening. BBC Radio 2 simulcast the final, with commentary by Ken Bruce, but did not broadcast the results show.

Malcolm Roberts had been one of six singers who had jointly represented Luxembourg in the Eurovision Song Contest 1985, thus becoming the second entrant in a UK final to have participated in Eurovision for another nation, after Dan Duskey (aka Michael Palace) in 1986.

UK Discography 
Samantha Janus - A Message to Your Heart: Hollywood HWD104 (7" Single)/HDW104T (12" Single)/HWD104CD (CD Single).
Malcolm Roberts - One Love: Madierpo 92/002 (Belgian release only).

At Eurovision 
Samantha Janus went on to represent United Kingdom in the Eurovision Song Contest 1991, she performed 20th on the night, after Spain and before Cyprus, finishing 10th with 47 points. Her backing singers on the night (as they had been in the UK final) were Zoe Picot, Lucy Moorby and Lyn Paul's sister Nikki Belcher. They were supported at the back of the stage by session singers Hazell Dean and former Belle and the Devotions lead singer, Kit Rolfe, who had been brought to Rome during rehearsals to help 'fix the vocals'.

Voting

References

1991
Countries in the Eurovision Song Contest 1991
Eurovision
Eurovision